The Nizami Mausoleum, built in honor of the 12th-century Persian poet Nizami Ganjavi, stands just outside the city of Ganja, Azerbaijan. The mausoleum was originally built in 1947 in place of an old collapsed mausoleum, and rebuilt in its present form in 1991.

History 
The tomb of Nizami has been a place of devoted pilgrimage for many centuries. According to historian Vasily Bartold, the mausoleum was first mentioned in historical chronicles in 1606. The Safavid court chronicler Iskander Beg Munshi reported that toward the end of February 1606, Shah Abbas I reached Ganja and camped near the tomb of Sheikh Nizami, where on 24 March he celebrated the holiday of Novruz.

During the Russo-Persian War in 1826 a decisive battle between Russian and Persian forces took place near the tomb of Nizami. The Russian forces under the command of General Ivan Paskevich defeated the Persian army and forced it to retreat. Russian envoy to Persia Aleksandr Griboyedov mentioned in his diary a conversation with writer and historian Abbasgulu Bakikhanov, a member of the Russian diplomatic mission at the time, in which the latter told him that Elisabethpol battle was near the Nizami tomb.

Collapse
According to Bakikhanov, by the 1840s the tomb of Nizami had collapsed, and former vezir of Karabakh khanate Mirza Adigozal bey was rebuilding it.

In 1873 Shah of Persia Naser al-Din Qajar, on the way home from his first tour in Europe, passed by the tomb of Nizami. He mentioned in his diary the tomb of Shaykh Nizami by the side of the road at about half a league or more from Ganja, and described it as "a very wretched brick building".

By the turn of the 20th century, the mausoleum became almost completely ruined. In 1925 the grave of the poet was excavated and his remains exhumed for reburial at the center of Ganja. However, the leadership of Soviet Azerbaijan ordered the reburial of the poet at the same location and the erection of a temporary monument.

In 1940, in connection with construction of a new mausoleum, an archaeological investigation revealed the remains of an ancient mausoleum deep under the ground, dating to the 13th century. The remains of an overground structure were a 19th-century restoration.

Reconstruction
In 1947 a new mausoleum was constructed from limestone. Later the Soviet government constructed an aluminium production plant in the vicinity of the mausoleum. The hazardous emissions from the plant seriously damaged the building, and it collapsed by the late 1980s.

The mausoleum was rebuilt in its present form after Azerbaijan regained its independence following the fall of the Soviet Union in 1991.

Building
It is a tall cylindrical building, surrounded by gardens. To one side, there are metal statues commemorating Nizami's epic poems. The mausoleum was constructed from solid granite blocks, delivered from the Ukraine. Farman Imamguliyev was the architect; the statues were created by sculptor Gorkhmaz Sujaddinov.

See also
 List of mausoleums

References

External links

 

Mausoleums in Azerbaijan
Monuments and memorials built in the Soviet Union
Tourist attractions in Ganja, Azerbaijan
Buildings and structures completed in 1947
Buildings and structures in Ganja, Azerbaijan
Buildings and structures completed in 1991
Monuments and memorials to Nizami Ganjavi
1947 establishments in the Soviet Union